was a Japanese visual kei rock band active from 2001 to 2008. In French, the band's name can be literally translated as "to enter in yourself/entering yourself" although this is not grammatically correct. The band was composed of five members, and had seen only one member change.

History
In 2001, the band started out with only four members—Satsuki, Takumi, Ryo, and Ao. In March 2003, Mika joined the band as the drummer. At the end of a tour in February 2004, Ao left the group due to "undesirable behavior" and was forced to apologize on stage by the vocalist of Devil Kitty. He was replaced by Shun within a month. At the end of that year the band started recording what would be their first album, Sphire Croid, released in early 2005. Later that year two EPs were released, Astre no Ito and Kein no Hitsugi.

The following year the band released its second album, Rentrer en Soi. The band was signed to European record label, Gan-Shin in 2006, and later to the American division of Free-Will. In 2007, the band's final studio album, The Bottom of Chaos, was released in Japan as well as Europe.

On October 19, 2007, the band played at the Oni-Con convention in Houston, Texas. This was their first concert in the United States.

2008 began with the announcement of their single, "Stigmata", released in March, as well as a coupling tour, "Tour 2008 Death Match", with Unsraw through Japan. The band was announced for the Free-Will event, "Clash Against Commercialism" at Nokia Theatre Times Square in New York City, however the event was cancelled two weeks prior due to difficulty obtaining visas for the musicians. Shortly after, Rentrer en Soi again announced they would perform in the United States for the AnimeNEXT convention.

On September 16, 2008, Rentrer en Soi announced that they would be breaking up. In October hey released a final EP, Megiddo, a best-of album titled Ain Soph Aur on November 19, 2008 and their last live was planned for December 25, 2008. The track list for Ain Soph Aur, their best-of album, cannot be viewed on their website. Ain Soph Aur features Kuuhaku no Joukei, a track that was not originally included on Yurikago, however it was featured as a PV on Cinema Cradle.

Members
 – vocals (2001–2008)
 – lead guitar (2001–2008)
 – rhythm guitar (2004–2008)
 – bass guitar (2001–2008)
 – drums (2003–2008)

Former members
 – rhythm guitar (2001–2004)

Discography

Albums
 Sphire Croid (January 26, 2005)
 Rentrer en Soi (May 31, 2006)
 The Bottom of Chaos (August 1, 2007)
 Ain Soph Aur (November 19, 2008)

Extended plays
Yurikago (ゆりかご) 
Kein no Hitsugi (Keinの棺) 
Astre no Ito (Astreの絲) 
Megiddo

Singles

DVD
 Cinema Cradle (August 25, 2004)
Millenarianism -The War Of Megiddo- (March 4, 2009)

Compilations
 Cure - Japanesque Rock Collectionz (July 28, 2004)
"Shinwa"
 Duel Shock!! 2~Rentrer en Soi vs Sulfuric Acid - Neo Shaped Children (April 5, 2004)
"Tenshi no Namida" and "Into the Sky"

References

External links
Official website
Official MySpace

Gan-Shin artists
Visual kei musical groups
Japanese hard rock musical groups
Japanese gothic rock groups
Musical groups established in 2001
Musical groups disestablished in 2008